Sue Kullen is an American politician from Maryland and a member of the Democratic Party. She served 2 terms in the Maryland House of Delegates, representing Maryland's District 27B in Calvert County. Kullen was originally appointed to the seat in 2004, and elected in 2006. She most recently served on the Health and Government Operations Committee and as President of the Women Legislators of Maryland, a nonpartisan committee of state legislators. In 2014, Kullen ran unsuccessfully for a seat in the Maryland House of Delegates in District 27C.

Career
Member of House of Delegates August 4, 2004 - January 12, 2011
Chief Deputy Majority Whip, 2007–2011
Member, Health and Government Operations Committee, 2004–2011
health occupations subcommittee, 2005
long-term care subcommittee, 2005
minority health disparities subcommittee, 2005–2011
pharmaceuticals subcommittee, 2005–06
 insurance subcommittee, 2007–2011
Joint Committee on Access to Mental Health Services, 2005–2011
Joint Committee on Health Care Delivery and Financing, 2007–2011
Member, Agricultural Stewardship Commission, 2005–06
Vice-Chair, Southern Maryland Delegation, 2006–2011
Chair, Calvert County Delegation, 2007–2011
Member, Maryland Educators Caucus, 2005–2011
Maryland Green Caucus, 2005–2011
Maryland Labor Caucus, 2005–2011
Maryland Rural Caucus, 2005–2011
Maryland Legislative Sportsmen's Caucus, 2005–2011
 Maryland Veterans Caucus, 2005–2011
 President, Women Legislators of Maryland, 2009–2011
member, 2005–2011
executive board, 2006–2011
2nd vice-president, 2007–08
Member and Vice-Chair, Maryland Developmental Disabilities Council, 1993–2003
Executive Board, Tri-County Council for Southern Maryland, 2004–2011
Member, Steering Committee, Juvenile Drug Court, Calvert County, 2005
Governor's Wellmobile Program Advisory Board, 2006–2011
 Working Waterfront Commission, 2007–2011

Legislative Notes
 voted for the Maryland Gang Prosecution Act of 2007 (HB713), subjecting gang members to up to 20 years in prison and/or a fine of up to $100,000 
 voted for Jessica’s Law (HB 930), eliminating parole for the most violent child sexual predators and creating a mandatory minimum sentence of 25 years in state prison, 2007 
 voted for Public Safety – Statewide DNA Database System – Crimes of Violence and Burglary – Post conviction (HB 370), helping to give police officers and prosecutors greater resources to solve crimes and eliminating a backlog of 24,000 unanalyzed DNA samples, leading to 192 arrests, 2008 
 voted for Vehicle Laws – Repeated Drunk and Drugged Driving Offenses – Suspension of License (HB 293), strengthening Maryland’s drunk driving laws by imposing a mandatory one year license suspension for a person convicted of drunk driving more than once in five years, 2009 
 voted for HB 102, creating the House Emergency Medical Services System Workgroup, leading to Maryland’s budgeting of $52 million to fund three new Medevac helicopters to replace the State’s aging fleet, 2009 

Delegate Kullen has annually voted to support classroom teachers, public schools, police and hospitals in Calvert County. Since 2002, funding to schools across the State has increased 82%, resulting in Maryland being ranked top in the nation for K-12 education.

References

Democratic Party members of the Maryland House of Delegates
Living people
Women state legislators in Maryland
1960 births
21st-century American politicians
21st-century American women politicians